Anna Akhmatova. The Silver Age (Rus. "Анна Ахматова. Серебряный Век") is a municipal museum in Avtovo (near the eponymous Avtovo metro station), a south-western area of Saint Petersburg, Russia, dedicated to life and work of Anna Akhmatova and other major Russian poets and literary figures of the first half of the 20th century whose  writing started during the Silver Age of Russian culture.

It is located on the ground floor of an ordinary apartment building.

Notes

 
Biographical museums in Saint Petersburg
Museums established in 1989
Literary museums in Saint Petersburg
Poetry museums
Women's museums
Anna Akhmatova